Delirium Records is an independent record label from the Inland Empire area of Southern California.

History
Delirium Records was founded in 1992 by Curt Sautter. Since the early 1980s Sautter had been working with punk and rock bands in the Los Angeles area of Southern California.

In 1986 Sautter founded Idol Maker Concepts (IMC) working with bands and artists to refine the artists sound and image. It became clear by 1992 that the music Sautter was producing needed an outlet.

Curt Sautter explained in an early interview that the primary reason for Delirium Records was to document the music that he felt was worth listening to. Sautter stated that some of his favorite records were released on small independent labels with small press runs. Delirium Records first three releases were released on 7-inch colors vinyl records. The first EP was the Globes "Hi-Fidelity Garage Pop" in 1994 followed by The Hoodlumz "Skin of the Soul in 1995 and Organized Crimes "Tales from the Crime" in 1996.

Since 1994 Delirium Records has had at least seventeen releases including four tribute CDs and the re-issue on the 1982 Los Angeles punk rock classic compilation, Life Is Ugly.

Artists on Delirium Records

 The Globe
 The Hoodlumz
 Organized Crime
 Velvet
 Danny Dean and The Homewreckers
 The Relatives
 Statica
 Chris Cruz

Releases by Delirium Records

 A Little Bit Me, A Little Bit Neil – Tribute to Neil Diamond
 The Immaculate Deception – Tribute to the music of Madonna
 Even Better Than The Real Thing – Tribute to U2
 Isn’t She Still… The Pretty in Pink Soundtrack Revisited
 Life Is Ugly – Various Artists
 Move It by Danny Dean & the Homewreckers
 Growl by Danny Dean & the Homewreckers
 The Rockabilly Lover by Danny Dean & the Homewreckers
 Meet… The Relatives – The Relatives
 Dirty Little Secret – The Relatives
 In My Heart by Chris Cruz
 On My Mind by Chris Cruz
 Statica by Statica
 Cyberspace Cowboy by Velvet
 Tales from the Crime by Organized Crime
 Skin Of The Soul by The Hoodlumz
 Hi-Fidelity Garage Pop by The Globe

External links
 Official Delirium Records website

American independent record labels
Record labels based in California
Companies based in San Bernardino County, California